Maryland Route 27 (MD 27) is a state highway in the U.S. state of Maryland. Known for most of its length as Ridge Road, the highway runs  from MD 355 in Germantown north to MD 30 in Manchester. MD 27 follows a ridge that separates several watersheds in northern Montgomery County and Carroll County. The highway connects Germantown and Manchester with Damascus in far northern Montgomery County; Westminster, the county seat of Carroll County; and Mount Airy, which lies at the junction of Carroll, Frederick, Howard, and Montgomery counties and where MD 27 intersects Interstate 70 (I-70)/U.S. Route 40 (US 40).

MD 27 follows what was originally MD 29 and part of MD 31. The highway received its present number south of Westminster in a swap with US 29 in 1934 and north of Westminster in 1967. Ridge Road south of Mount Airy and Manchester Road between Westminster and Manchester was constructed as one of the original state roads in the early to mid-1910s. The Mount Airy– Westminster portion of MD 27 was built in the 1920s. MD 27 was reconstructed in the early to mid-1950s from Germantown to Westminster. MD 31 was reconstructed north of Westminster in the late 1950s; old segments of the highway became part of MD 852. MD 27 bypassed Mount Airy in the 1970s, leaving behind MD 808. The highway was relocated at its southern end in the mid-1990s to improve access between Damascus and Germantown and I-270.

Route description
MD 27 runs on top of or in the vicinity of a long ridge known for most of its length as Parr's Ridge. This ridge separates several sets of watersheds in central Maryland, with the result that MD 27 bridges no significant streams. From Germantown to south of Damascus, the ridge separates the waters of Little Seneca Creek to the west and Great Seneca Creek to the east; these creeks come together at Dawsonville and flow into the Potomac River. From Damascus north, all streams west of the ridge flow into the Monocacy River, including Bennett Creek, Bush Creek, and Little and Big Pipe Creek from south to north. All east-side streams flow into the Patuxent River from Damascus to the south of Mount Airy, the South Branch of the Patapsco River from Mount Airy to Taylorsville, and the Patapsco River North Branch from Taylorsville to Manchester. MD 27 is part of the National Highway System as a principal arterial in five sections: from MD 355 in Germantown to Gue Road in Damascus; from Penn Shop Road south of Mount Airy to the Frederick– Carroll county line; from I-70 to the northern town limit of Mount Airy; from Chapel Road south of Westminster to Old Manchester Road in Mexico; and from the southern town limit of Manchester to MD 30.

Germantown to Mount Airy

MD 27 begins as Ridge Road at an intersection with MD 355 (Frederick Road) on the northern edge of Germantown. Ridge Road continues west as a six-lane divided county highway to a partial cloverleaf interchange with I-270 (Eisenhower Memorial Highway), beyond which the county highway continues as Father Hurley Boulevard, one of the primary arteries of Germantown. MD 27 curves north through a directional intersection with Henderson Corner Road and reduces from a six-lane divided highway to a two-lane undivided road past its intersection with Brink Road. The highway passes through the hamlet of Cedar Grove on its way to Damascus. At Damascus High School, MD 27 gains a center left-turn lane, a second lane northbound, then becomes a four-lane undivided highway. The highway becomes two lanes again at the west end of downtown Damascus, curves east then turn north to remain on Ridge Road. The road continues straight east as MD 108 (Main Street), which leads to MD 124 (Woodfield Road).

MD 27 starts of Damascus as a four-lane undivided highway but quickly drops to two lanes. At the north end of the unincorporated town, the state highway meets the northern end of county-maintained Woodfield Road. MD 27 meets the eastern end of MD 80 (Kemptown Road) in the hamlet of Claggettsville. The highway crosses the Patuxent River just south of its source and passes through the western edge of Howard County. Between a pair of intersections with Penn Shop Road, MD 27 crosses a sliver of Montgomery County before entering Frederick County and expanding to a four-lane divided highway. The highway meets the west end of the Mount Airy–Ellicott City segment of MD 144 (Old National Pike). The intersection is just west of Parrs Spring, the source of the South Branch of the Patapsco River. Parrs Spring contains the quadripoint where the boundaries of Montgomery, Howard, Frederick, and Carroll counties meet.

Mount Airy to Manchester

North of MD 144, MD 27 briefly follows the Frederick– Carroll county line before fully entering Carroll County and the town of Mount Airy at its partial cloverleaf interchange with I-70/US 40 (Baltimore National Pike). The west leg of MD 27's intersection with the ramp from westbound I-70/US 40 meets the southern end of Main Street, which becomes MD 808 north of Ridgeville Boulevard. The MD 27– Main Street intersection is directly above the tunnel CSX's Old Main Line Subdivision railroad line uses to pass through Parrs Ridge. The state highway becomes undivided north of Ridgeville Boulevard; the highway passes a longitudinal park and ride facility before intersecting Park Avenue and Twin Arch Road, where the route drops to two lanes. MD 27 leaves and re-enters Mount Airy a few times before leaving for good south of its intersection with MD 808 (Main Street) in the hamlet of Dorceytown.

MD 27 continues north along the top of Parrs Ridge. The highway intersects MD 26 (Liberty Road) at Taylorsville and meets the eastern end of MD 407 (Marston Road) north of there. MD 27 crosses Morgan Run south of the hamlet of Warfieldsburg and crosses the Maryland Midland Railway and Little Pipe Creek at Spring Mills. The state highway enters a dense residential neighborhood just north of its junction with Bond Street but does not enter the city of Westminster and the Westminster Historic District until George Street. MD 27 follows Liberty Street for three blocks to Main Street; at that intersection, the state highway and Main Street intersect the Maryland Midland Railway and MD 27 becomes Railroad Avenue. The route parallels the railroad through an industrial area and has a center turn lane until its four-ramp partial cloverleaf interchange with MD 97 and MD 140 (Baltimore Boulevard).

MD 27 heads northeast out of the city of Westminster and becomes Manchester Road. The highway crosses the Maryland Midland Railway and the West Branch of the North Branch of the Patapsco River ahead of its intersection with unsigned MD 852G (Old Manchester Road). MD 27 crosses Cranberry Branch before reaching Mexico, where the highway meets the western end of MD 482 (Hampstead Mexico Road) and the northern end of MD 852G (Old Manchester Road). The highway is paralleled by several segments of Old Manchester Road, most of the segments of MD 852. MD 27 intersects a non-state segment of the old road, Westminster Street, shortly before the route enters the town of Manchester and passes south of a park and ride lot before reaching its northern terminus at MD 30 (Hanover Pike), the town's main street.

History

Ridge Road was designated MD 29 and Manchester Road was marked as MD 31 when the Maryland State Roads Commission first assigned numbers to state roads in 1927. MD 29 became MD 27 in a number swap with the original MD 27, which ran from Silver Spring to Ellicott City when the latter highway became part of US 29 in 1934. MD 27 was extended north along Manchester Road in place of MD 31, which was truncated at Westminster, in 1967.

Original construction

Ridge Road from Germantown to Mount Airy and Manchester Road from Westminster to Manchester were included in the original state road system drawn up by the Maryland State Roads Commission in 1909. The segment of the highway from the National Pike (now Ridgeville Boulevard) at Ridgeville to the Baltimore and Ohio Railroad (now CSX's Old Main Line Subdivision) in the center of Mount Airy was paved by 1910. In 1911, Ridge Road was built as a  macadam road from the National Pike south to the Patuxent River. That same year, construction began from Henderson's Corner at Frederick Road north of Germantown to Davis Mill Road near Cedar Grove. That segment was completed as a  macadam road in 1912. That portion of Ridge Road was extended to near Kings Valley in 1914. The gap from south of Damascus to the Patuxent River was completed as a  concrete road from the Patuxent River to Claggettsville in 1913 and through Damascus in 1915. Manchester Road was completed as a  macadam road from the Westminster city limit north to Cranberry Station on the Western Maryland Railway (now Maryland Midland Railway) in 1911. The road was extended to just south of Mexico in 1913; in addition, construction on the state road began from the town limit of Manchester. The gap between Mexico and south of Manchester was filled in 1914. The northernmost part of the highway, a concrete road along Westminster Street in the town of Manchester, was completed by 1921.

Work on Ridge Road between Mount Airy and Westminster began with the construction of a concrete road from the existing macadam road in Mount Airy north to Dorceytown between 1918 and 1920. The concrete road was started from the Westminster end and reached a point north of Warfieldsburg by 1923. The modern highway was extended south through Warfieldsburg and north from Dorceytown to the north of Gillis Falls Road by 1927. The northern segment was extended south to Morgan Run and the southern segment north to Gillis Road in 1928. Ridge Road was completed from Mount Airy to Westminster when the gap through Taylorsville was filled in 1929. The Germantown–Mount Airy portion of Ridge Road once served as the primary highway between Frederick and Rockville, but was eclipsed by the  highway through Hyattstown and Urbana when that highway, designated US 240 (now MD 355), was completed in 1926.

Modernization and improvements

The highway between Cedar Grove and Damascus was widened and resurfaced in 1953 and 1954; this work included a major relocation that replaced a curvaceous segment on what is now Oak Drive. Modernization of MD 27 between Germantown and Mount Airy concluded when the portion between US 240 and Cedar Grove was widened and resurfaced between 1954 and 1956.

MD 27 and MD 31 were widened and resurfaced through Westminster starting in 1952. MD 27 was widened and resurfaced from Westminster to the south of Warfieldsburg between 1950 and 1954; this work included a relocation at Spring Mills. Work on the highway from south of Warfieldsburg to Taylorsville and there to Mount Airy; both widening and resurfacing projects got underway in 1954 and were completed in 1956. Construction began on reconstructing and widening MD 31 from Manchester to Westminster in 1957. This project involved several relocations of the highway, including moving Manchester Road to its present terminus at MD 30, by the time it was completed in 1960. Sections of the old road became segments of MD 852, including MD 852G between Westminster and Mexico.

MD 27's original interchange with I-70 was constructed when US 40 was relocated as a four-lane divided highway through Ridgeville in 1953 and 1954. This interchange was a four-ramp partial cloverleaf along the line of Mount Airy's Main Street directly on the Carroll– Frederick county line. MD 27's bypass of Mount Airy was constructed from Dorceytown south to Ridgeville Boulevard in 1972. MD 27's I-70 interchange was reconstructed to its present six-ramp partial cloverleaf design slightly to the east of the old interchange as part of I-70's upgrade to Interstate standards in 1975. MD 27's bypass of Mount Airy was completed from Ridgeville Boulevard south to the I-70 interchange in 1977; MD 808 was marked on Main Street by 1978. MD 27 was relocated at its southern end as a divided highway from MD 355 to Brink Road between 1993 and 1996. This work was part of a state– county project to connect Ridge Road and Father Hurley Boulevard with I-270 to improve access between I-270, Germantown, and Damascus. The old segment of MD 27 became Henderson Corner Road.

Junction list

Auxiliary routes
MD 27 has five auxiliary routes between Westminster and Manchester.
The highway begins at MD 852F, which parallels the southbound side of MD 27, intersects MD 27, and ends east of an intersection with county-maintained Random Ridge Road, which parallels the northbound side of MD 27. 
MD 27B is the designation for the unnamed  connector between MD 27 and MD 852B, which parallels the southbound side of MD 27. 
MD 27C is the designation for the unnamed  connector between MD 27 and MD 852C near the latter highway's southern end. MD 852C parallels the northbound side of MD 27 near Manchester.
MD 27D is the designation for the unnamed  connector between MD 27 and MD 852C near the latter highway's midpoint.
MD 27E is the designation for the unnamed  connector between MD 27 and MD 852C near the latter highway's northern end, south of Westminster Street.

See also

References

External links

MDRoads: MD 27
Maryland Roads - MD 27

027
Maryland Route 027
Maryland Route 027
Maryland Route 027
Maryland Route 027